Augustin Alfred Joseph Paul-Boncour (4 August 1873 – 28 March 1972) was a French politician and diplomat of the Third Republic. He was a member of the Republican-Socialist Party (PRS) and served as Prime Minister of France from December 1932 to January 1933. He also served in a number of other government positions during the 1930s and as a Permanent Delegate to the League of Nations in 1936 during his tenure as Minister of State.

Career
Born in Saint-Aignan, Loir-et-Cher, Paul-Boncour received a law degree from the University of Paris and became active in the labor movement, organizing the legal council of the Bourses du Travail (workers' associations). He was private secretary to Premier Pierre Waldeck-Rousseau from 1898 to 1902. Elected to the Chamber of Deputies as a Radical in 1909, he held his seat until 1914, briefly serving as Minister of Labour from March to June 1911. After serving in the military during World War I, he returned to the French National Assembly.

Turning to Socialism, he joined the SFIO in 1916. Paul-Boncour left the socialist party in 1931 because he considered imperative, in face of the League of Nations progressive powerlessness, to reinforce national defence, something the socialists opposed. After his resignation from the SFIO in 1931 he joined the Republican-Socialist Party (PRS), which in 1935 merged with the French Socialist Party (PSF) and the Socialist Party of France-Jean Jaurès Union PSdF) to form the Socialist Republican Union (USR).  Also in 1931, Paul-Boncour was elected to the Senate, and served in that capacity until the establishment of the Vichy régime in 1940 (during World War II).

During his time as a Senator, Paul-Boncour served in a variety of cabinet and diplomatic posts. He was the Permanent Delegate to the League of Nations from 1932 to 1936, Minister of War in 1932, Premier from December 1932 to January 1933, and Foreign Minister on two occasions (December 1932 to January 1934 and March–April 1938).

Paul-Boncour was opposed to the formation of the Vichy government, and recommended continuing the fight against Nazi Germany after the fall of France, from Algiers. As a member of the Consultative Assembly from 1944, he led the French delegation to the United Nations conference in San Francisco and signed the United Nations Charter on behalf of France. He once again served as a senator from 1946 to 1948.

He died in Paris on 28 March 1972 at the age of 98.

Paul-Boncour's Ministry, 18 December 1932 – 31 January 1933
Joseph Paul-Boncour – President of the Council and Minister of Foreign Affairs
Édouard Daladier – Minister of War
Camille Chautemps – Minister of the Interior
Henri Chéron – Minister of Finance
Albert Dalimier – Minister of Labour and Social Security Provisions
Abel Gardey – Minister of Justice
Georges Leygues – Minister of Marine
Léon Meyer – Minister of Merchant Marine
Paul Painlevé – Minister of Air
Anatole de Monzie – Minister of National Education
Edmond Miellet – Minister of Pensions
Henri Queuille – Minister of Agriculture
Albert Sarraut – Minister of Colonies
Georges Bonnet – Minister of Public Works
Charles Daniélou – Minister of Public Health
Laurent Eynac – Minister of Posts, Telegraphs, and Telephones
Julien Durand – Minister of Commerce and Industry

List of positions held

References

External links

 

1873 births
1972 deaths
People from Loir-et-Cher
Politicians from Centre-Val de Loire
Republican-Socialist Party politicians
French Section of the Workers' International politicians
Socialist Republican Union politicians
Prime Ministers of France
French Foreign Ministers
French Ministers of War
French Ministers of War and National Defence
State ministers of France
Government ministers of France
Members of the 9th Chamber of Deputies of the French Third Republic
Members of the 10th Chamber of Deputies of the French Third Republic
Members of the 12th Chamber of Deputies of the French Third Republic
Members of the 13th Chamber of Deputies of the French Third Republic
Members of the 14th Chamber of Deputies of the French Third Republic
French Senators of the Third Republic
French Senators of the Fourth Republic
Senators of Loir-et-Cher
French senators elected by the National Assembly
The Vichy 80
20th-century French diplomats
French military personnel of World War I